The 1915 Florida Gators football team represented the University of Florida during the 1915 Southern Intercollegiate Athletic Association football season. The season was C. J. McCoy's second as the head coach of the Florida Gators football team.  McCoy's 1915 Florida Gators completed their tenth varsity football season with an overall record of 4–3 and their sixth year in the Southern Intercollegiate Athletic Association (SIAA) with a conference record of 3–3.

Before the season
Last year, first-year head coach Charles J. McCoy had churned out a Florida team in the top half of the SIAA. McCoy this year was also the school's first basketball coach.

The team's captain was tackle A. A. "Daddy" Lotspeich. At the guards were Ham Dowling, future Georgia Tech transfer, and Everett Yon, future Gator athletic director. Leading the backfield was  Rammy Ramsdell,  "the Gators' first quarterback of note," and first scholarship athlete at the University of Florida.

Assisting the team was Z. J. Stanley, last year the coach of the Maryville Scots.

Schedule

Season summary

Auburn

Sources:

The season opened with a 7–0 loss to Auburn. Florida played hard for three quarters, until Wren scored the winning touchdown in the final period.

The starting lineup was Henderson (left end), Lotspiech (left tackle), Callen (left guard), Farrin (center), Yon (right guard), Goldsby (right tackle), Roble (right end), Ramsdell (quarterback), Thompson (left halfback), Fuller (right halfback), Sparkman (fullback).

Sewanee

Sources:

Florida lost to coach Harris Cope's Sewanee Tigers 7–0, continuing the losing streak against the Tigers. The Sewanee game was then the largest crowd to see a game in Jacksonville.

"After scoring one touchdown Sewanee was content to allow Florida to exhaust herself in vain attempts to find the weak spot in the Purple defense." Sewanee's Ellerbe scored the game's only touchdown.

The starting lineup was Henderson (left end), Lotspeich (left tackle), Dowling (left guard), Farrior (center), Yon (right guard), Goldsby (right tackle), Robles (right end), Ramsdell (quarterback), Sparkman (left halfback), Thompson (right halfback), Fuller (fullback).

Florida Southern
The Gators lengthened their winning streak against  with an easy 45–0 victory.

Georgia

Sources:

The Gators lost their first-ever game against coach Alex Cunningham's Georgia Bulldogs 0–37 in Jacksonville, at a larger crowder than at the Sewanee game. The Gators carried the ball to Georgia's 15-yard line in the first period, but never threatened afterwards. Georgia put across two touchdowns in the second quarter, and had a strong second half.

The starting lineup was Henderson (left end), Lotspeich (left tackle), Dowling (left guard), Farrior (center), Robles (right guard), Goldsby (right tackle), Lovell (right end), Ramsdell (quarterback), Sparkman (left halfback), Thompson (right halfback), Fuller (fullback).

The Citadel

Sources:

Florida beat The Citadel 6–0 in a game "marked by frequent fumbling." Florida scored when, in the third quarter, Sparkman rushed for an 8-yard touchdown.

Tulane
In a torrential rain, Florida met Tulane for the first time and upset the Olive and Blue 14–7, the highlight of the season. Rammy Ramsdell scored the game-winning touchdown, "crashing through center" and zig-zagging 60 yards to the endzone.

The starting lineup was Henderson (left end), Lotspeich (left tackle), Yon (left guard), Farrior (center), Robles (right guard), Goldsby (right tackle), Wilkinson (right end), Ramsdell (quarterback), Sparkman (left halfback), Thompson (right halfback), Fuller (fullback).

Mercer

Sources:

The Gators defeated the Mercer Baptists 34–7. Rammy Ramsdell had a then-school record of four touchdowns.

According to one account, Ramsdell in fact scored three touchdowns but set up all five. The first was a Sparkman touchdown set up by a 25-yard end run from Ramsdell, the second was a 5-yard run by Fuller set up by a 40-yard pass from Ramsdell to Henderson.

The starting lineup was Henderson (left end), Lotspeich (left tackle), Robles (left guard), Farrior (center), Yon (right guard), Goldsby (right tackle), Wilkinson (right end), Ramsdell (quarterback), Thomson (left halfback), Sparkman (right halfback), Fuller (fullback).

Personnel

Line

Backfield

Subs

Coaching staff
Head coach: Charles J. McCoy
Assistant coach: Z. J. Stanley
Manager: T. J. Swanson

References

Bibliography
 
 

Florida
Florida Gators football seasons
Florida Gators football